Symphony Masses: Ho Drakon Ho Megas is the third studio album released in April 1993 by Swedish band Therion. The album was remastered and re-released by Nuclear Blast in 2000 as part of The Early Chapters of Revelation box-set.

Etymology 
In Ancient Greek Ho Drakon Ho Megas means "The Great Dragon". Uttering Ho Drakon Ho Megas is typically used at the end of  ceremonies and rituals when conjuring Draconian force in a magical order Dragon Rouge, in which head of the band Christofer Johnsson used to be member.

Recording and production 
Active Records, Therion's music label, decided to scale down their operations and the band was switched to the new owners, Megarock Records. The band was recording the album from December 1992 to January 1993 in The Montezuma Studio in Stockholm, Sweden, with the aid of engineer Rex Gisslén. Symphony Masses: Ho Drakon Ho Megas was released under changed line-up; only Christofer Johnsson remained. During the playing Beyond Sanctorum tour, band ran into a few personnel problems. Oskar Forss decided to leave the band, Peter Hansson quit the band after health problems. Piotr Wawrzeniuk, from the band Carbonized in which Johnsson also played, took up drumming duties. The guitar was taken up by Magnus Barthelsson, an old school friend of Johnsson's, while Andreas Wahl took up the bass.

Songs, lyrical themes and influences 

The album marks the band's departure from typical death metal in favor of experimentation with traditional doom metal, goth rock, progressive rock, jazz, symphonic classical, Persian traditional music, Arabic music, and 1980s heavy metal inspired by Iron Maiden and Judas Priest. The focus of lyrical themes changed from social and environmental issues and Lovecraftian fantasy to occult topics, including qliphoth, the mythological demon Lilith, and the Abyss (Thelema).

The Japanese version released by Toy's Factory label includes three bonus tracks—"Enter the Voids" and 1991 demo versions of "Beyond Sanctorum" and "Symphony of the Dead", both from Beyond Sanctorum. A 2006 Therion's box-set Celebrators of Becoming includes the following songs from the album—"Baal Reginon" (recorded in Zug, Switzerland, 1994), "Dark Princess Naamah" (Buenos Aires, Argentina, 1995), "A Black Rose" (Buenos Aires, Argentina, 1995), "Dawn of Perishness" (Huddinge, Sweden, 1993 and Buenos Aires, Argentina, 1995).

The song "A Black Rose" has been included in a Nuclear Blast DVD compilation Death... Is Just the Beginning Classics released on March 25, 2002.

Song lyrics have been published officially for four songs only—"Baal Reginon", "Dark Princess Naamah", "Powerdance" and "Procreation of Eternity".

Reception

Symphony Masses: Ho Drakon Ho Megas mostly gained very positive reviews. It has received 4 of 5 rating by Allmusic with songs "Dark Princess Naamah", "Dawn of Perishness" and "Ho Drakon Ho Megas: The Dragon Throne/Fire and Ecstacy" picked by its staff, and 3.47 of 5 by Rate Your Music community being number 473 in its 1993 ranking.

Track listing
All songs were written by Christofer Johnsson.

Personnel 

 Therion
Christofer Johnsson – vocals, guitar, keyboards
Magnus Barthelsson – guitar
Andreas Wallan Wahl – bass guitar
Piotr Wawrzeniuk – drums

 Production
Rex Gisslén – engineer, producer
 Cover design
Kristian Wåhlin – cover illustration
Mikael P. Eriksson – cover photographs and design

Release history

Notes

References

External links
 Symphony Masses: Ho Drakon Ho Megas at the official website
 

 Audio samples
 Symphony Masses: Ho Drakon Ho Megas at Amazon.com

1993 albums
Albums with cover art by Kristian Wåhlin
Megarock Records albums
Nuclear Blast albums
Therion (band) albums